Dorfromantik is a city-building puzzle video game developed and published by Toukana Interactive. In the game, players need to place hexagonal tiles of various biomes to create an idyllic landscape. The game was released in March 2021 for Windows via early access and had its full release on April 28, 2022. A version for Nintendo Switch was released on September 29, 2022.

Gameplay 
The game involves placing hexagonal tiles that contain a combination of one or more of the following land uses, forest, barren, village, water, railroad, and field, with one land use along each side. The game begins with a barren tile and 40 new but random tiles to be placed. New tiles can be rotated before placing and must touch at least one side to an existing tile, once placed the tile cannot be moved. Both water and railroad tiles have to connect to already placed water or railroad if the tile is placed next to an existing water or railroad tile, limiting the possible orientation and adding further complexity to the game. Points are awarded for connecting the same land uses, special quests that involve creating an area of the same land use of a certain size, for example 10 field, and closing off an area to that land use, for example closing a forest so no new forest can be attached. Additional tiles are awarded for completing quests, closing areas, and for matching every side of a tile to the same land use on the surrounding tiles. The game ends when the player runs out of tiles.

A creative mode was added into the game in August 2021, allowing players to construct cities and villages with an infinite number of tiles.

Development 
Dorfromantik was developed by four German students studying at HTW Berlin (Luca Langenberg, Sandro Heuberger, and Zwi Zausch, and Timo Falcke). The four founded an independent studio named Toukana Interactive to work on the game. The four students began developing prototypes for their game during a game jam at Ludum Dare in April 2020, with the idea of Dorfromantik, which translates into "village romanticization", being one of them. The tiles featured in the game were inspired by board games, while the game's art style was influenced by both landscape paintings and photography.

The game was released via early access on March 25, 2021. While the 1.0 version of the game was initially set to be released in mid or late 2021, the release date was later pushed to early 2022 as the team needed more time to release new content prior to the game's official launch. The game was released in full on April 28, 2022. A Nintendo Switch version is set to release on September 29, 2022.

Reception 

Dorfromantik received generally positive reviews when it was released via early access. For the full release, the game received "generally favorable" reviews according to review aggregator Metacritic.

Eurogamer praised the title for being simple enough to play casually, but mastering tile placement made it compelling in the long run. The Guardian liked the atmosphere of Dorfromantik, writing, "the ambience is soothing, your actions gently shooed along by a spare but cheery piano and synth soundtrack." Polygon enjoyed how the game discouraged optimization, instead focusing on offering new challenges for the player to contend with, "This is a very clean and logical system that has been designed to produce unexpected, organic outcomes. That's an incredible achievement". While enjoying the progression system, Destructoid criticized the lack of variety in the tile sets, "There are "biomes" that you can find by branching out far enough, but these merely change the colors of the trees, ground, and houses. I think it would be neat if enough village tiles would give way to more modern skyblockers". Rock Paper Shotgun loved creative mode, saying that it was, "particularly generous, as it lets you save those picturesque creations you've spent so long building up in both your mind and onscreen, and seeing them through to their imagined conclusion".

Accolades

References

External links 
 

2022 video games
City-building games
Early access video games
Indie video games
Nintendo Switch games
Puzzle video games
Single-player video games
Video games developed in Germany
Windows games